Lucas Sandström (born March 23, 1990) is a Swedish professional ice hockey winger who plays for the Sheffield Steelers of the Elite Ice Hockey League (EIHL).

Sandström previously played five regular season games in the Elitserien for Mora IK during the 2007–08 season where he scored no points. On September 24, 2019, Sandström signed for the Sheffield Steelers of the United Kingdom's Elite Ice Hockey League as a replacement for Martin St. Pierre following his release from the team.

He is the nephew of former NHL player Tomas Sandström.

References

External links

1990 births
Living people
Almtuna IS players
Asplöven HC players
IF Björklöven players
Leksands IF players
Malmö Redhawks players
Mora IK players
Swedish ice hockey forwards
People from Fagersta Municipality
Sportspeople from Västmanland County